Jack R. Keller (June 16, 1922 – January 2, 2003) was an American comic book artist best known for his 1950s and 1960s work on the Marvel Comics Western character Kid Colt, and for his later hot rod and racecar series at Charlton Comics.

Biography

Early life and career
The self-taught Keller broke into comics in 1941, a year after graduating from West Reading High School, creating a single-appearance feature called "The Whistler" (no relation to the radio-show character) in Dell Comics' War Stories #5 (1942; no cover date). This led to work the following year with Quality Comics, where he worked in lesser or greater capacities on such comic-book series as Blackhawk and such features as "Man Hunter" and "Spin Shaw". As well, Keller drew backgrounds for Will Eisner's eight-page newspaper Sunday-supplement comic The Spirit, working with serviceman Eisner's World War II fill-in artist, Lou Fine. Keller additionally drew for the publisher Fiction House, including the feature "Suicide Smith" in the aviation-themed Wings Comics. 

In 1950, Keller became a staff artist at Atlas, publisher Martin Goodman's 1950s predecessor to Marvel Comics. The dependable, unflashy Keller drew Western, horror and, working with writer Carl Wessler, crime stories.

Kid Colt and hot rods
Keller began his long association with Kid Colt in Kid Colt, Outlaw #25 (March 1953). He stayed with the character for at least a dozen years in that signature title, as well as in such anthology series as All Western Winners, Two-Gun Western and Gunsmoke Western. In 1955, Keller also began freelancing for the low-budget Charlton Comics, based in Derby, Connecticut, drawing Western and war stories for titles including Billy the Kid, Cheyenne Kid, Battlefield Action, Fightin' Air Force, Fightin' Army, Fightin' Marines and Submarine Attack.

Following the near-demise of Atlas' comic-book line in 1957, and the accompanying cutbacks and firings, Keller supplemented his income by  working in a car dealership in his home town. Within two years, he would be back freelancing for Atlas / Marvel. By this time, Keller was also indulging his love of race cars and model cars by writing and drawing such Charlton comics as Grand Prix, Hot Rod Racers, Hot Rods and Racing Cars, Teenage Hotrodders, Drag 'n' Wheels, Surf 'n' Wheels  and World of Wheels. He stopped drawing for Marvel Comics by 1967, when Kid Colt, Outlaw had become mostly reprints, then drew a small number of stories for DC Comics from 1968 to 1971, including for the licensed toy-car comic Hot Wheels. He also continued to draw for Charlton, where his last known comics work was the cover and the accompanying eight-page story "The Rescuers" in the combat title Attack #14 (Nov. 1973).

Comics writer and historian Tony Isabella wrote that Keller

Later career and death
Keller returned to selling cars at Marshall Chevrolet in Reading, Pennsylvania and later was a part-time salesperson for Fun Stuff Hobbies and for Kiddie Kar Kollectibles.

Keller died at St. Joe's Hospital in Reading, age 80, on January 2, 2003. He was buried at Forest Hills cemetery in Reiffton, Pennsylvania, and was survived by sons Richard and Robert, and by a sister, Vivian Riegel.

Critical assessment
Cartoonist and columnist Fred Hembeck wrote that,

References

Further reading
 Jack Keller interview, Comic Book Artist #12, March 2001, pp. 78–83
 Charlton Spotlight #3 (Winter/Spring 2004), p. 61: "Jack Keller Flags Home"
 Jack Keller, Western artist, 1973 interview by John A. Mozzer

External links

 Jack Keller at the Lambiek Comiclopedia
 Kid Colt, Outlaw at Don Markstein's Toonopedia. Archived at Don Markstein's Toonopedia. Archived October 25, 2011
 Kid Colt at An International Catalogue of Superheroes. WebCitation archive at An International Catalogue of Superheroes. WebCitation archive.

American comics artists
Golden Age comics creators
Silver Age comics creators
Atlas Comics
Marvel Comics people
Charlton Comics
People from Reading, Pennsylvania
2003 deaths
1922 births